The Four Holy Marshals (Vier Marschälle Gottes or just Vier Marschälle) are four saints venerated in the Rhineland, especially at Cologne, Liège, Aachen, and Eifel.   They are conceived as standing particularly close to throne of God, and thus powerful intercessors.  Their joint veneration is comparable to that of the Fourteen Holy Helpers, who are also venerated in the Rhineland.

They are considered “marshals of God” and were invoked against diseases and epidemics during the Middle Ages.

Evidence of this devotion is testified by documentation dating from 1478; however, the joint devotion of these four saints may have existed earlier.   The devotion reached its high point in the fifteenth and sixteenth centuries and diminished by the seventeenth.  There were churches dedicated to them at Hüngersdorf, Schleiden, and in the Mariwald.

The Four Holy Marshals

The four saints are:

In terms of protection over animals, Anthony is the patron of pigs, Cornelius cattle, Hubertus dogs, and Quirinus horses.  In addition, each saint has its own particular place of special veneration: Anthony was venerated at Cologne, Hubertus at St-Hubert in the Ardennes, Cornelius at Aachen, and Quirinus at Neuss.

See also
Fourteen Holy Helpers
Military saint

References

External links
 Vier heilige Marschälle
 Das war Papst Cornelius
 Einer der vier hl. Marschälle
 Der Heilige mit dem Horn/Beschützer des Hornviehs
 Helfer bei der Kornelkrankheit
 Verehrung und Bräuche 
 Der Raub der vier heiligen Marschälle
 http://www.cornelissen.de/cor_pap1.htm

Christian folklore
Quartets